Steven Wallis (born 10 September 1981) is a Canadian YouTuber. He is primarily known for his videos about camping and outdoor recreation.

Early life
Steven Wallis was born in Vancouver on 10 September 1981. For a period of time as a young man, he lived in an RV in Victoria. When recalling this period of his life, he explained that the arrangement (which he referred to as "boondocking") was out of necessity and not choice.

Career 
When Wallis first became acquainted with YouTube, he assumed that it was a forum for posting viral joke videos. After posting a video of himself camping in -32°C weather, and seeing the enthusiastic response it garnered in the comments section, he decided to focus on creating more of this type of content. Since its creation on 19 April 2010, his YouTube channel has focused on non-traditional styles of camping, such as "boondocking", "urban stealth", gold mining, "bushcraft", and yard camping. Many of his projects are centered on "taking back camping for the people" and see him camping in parking lots, starting fires with hand sanitizer, and avoiding expensive camping equipment. He also enjoys drinking a beer after he has set up camp, which he refers to as "step two" of his process. As of July 2020, he posted weekly videos on Thursdays with 15-25 minute videos of "setting up camp, getting the fire ready, preparing [his] meal, going to bed, waking up, breaking down camp, and heading out".

Personal life 
Wallis resides near Edson, Alberta. He previously resided in Edmonton, where he often does his "stealth camping". Outside of his YouTube career, he is the proprietor of a heating company. 

On August 25, 2022, Wallis revealed that his wife Jess had died unexpectedly in her sleep five days prior, and that he would be taking a hiatus but would not stop making videos completely as she would want him to continue.

References

Living people
1981 births
Canadian YouTubers
YouTube channels launched in 2010